Mikhail Yevsevyevich Yupp (Михаил Евсевиевич Юпп, born July 5, 1938, Leningrad) is a Russian poet and academic. He lives in Philadelphia, US.

Some of his books are illustrated by Mikhail Shemyakin.

Awards
Yupp was awarded by Pushkin medal and a diplom of "Russian America" newspaper as "The best poet of 2005".

External links
Biography and works
http://www.drugieberega.com/authors/MYu
Poetry of Yupp

Russian male poets
1938 births
Living people
Writers from Saint Petersburg
Russian emigrants to the United States